Felicissima is a Latin female name meaning "most happy". It may refer to:

 Saint Felicissima of Felicissima and Illuminata, a 3rd-century saint of Umbria, often linked with Saint Firmina
 Saint Felicissima, as in Gratilianus and Felicissima, Roman martyrs